Andriy Yevhenovych Hert (born 2 September 1994) is a Ukrainian professional footballer who plays as a left back for German club Kirchheimer SC.

References

External links
 
 

1994 births
Living people
Footballers from Dnipro
Ukrainian footballers
Association football defenders
FC Zorya Luhansk players
FC VPK-Ahro Shevchenkivka players
FC Inhulets Petrove players
FC Naftovyk-Ukrnafta Okhtyrka players
FC Nyva Ternopil players
FC Hirnyk-Sport Horishni Plavni players
FC Alians Lypova Dolyna players
Ukrainian First League players
Ukrainian Second League players
Ukrainian expatriate footballers
Expatriate footballers in Germany
Ukrainian expatriate sportspeople in Germany